The 1987 World Netball Championships was the seventh edition of the INF Netball World Cup held in Glasgow, Scotland. This quadrennial premier event in international netball featured 17 teams, and included the debut of Cook Islands.

The format of the 1987 edition was similar to the previous edition with the teams separated into two groups with the top two continuing on to the final round. New Zealand claimed their third title going unbeaten throughout the entire tournament.

First round

Group A

Group B

Placement round

Group 13-17

Group 9-12

Group 5-8

Final round

Final placings

Medallists

References

1987
1987 in netball
World
International sports competitions in Glasgow
1980s in Glasgow
August 1987 sports events in Europe